Lost Words: Beyond the Page is a puzzle-platform game developed by Sketchbook Games and published by Modus Games. The game was released for Stadia on March 27 2020, then for Nintendo Switch, Microsoft Windows, PlayStation 4, and Xbox One on April 6 2021.

Plot
Isabelle (Izzy) is a young, aspiring writer who keeps a personal journal. The game takes place in Estoria, a fantasy world which emerges from the diary entries that Isabelle keeps. The player character is crowned as the Guardian of Fireflies and must restore the fireflies to their village after it has been destroyed by a dragon. The real-world turmoil that affects Isabelle's life leads to consequences that affect the fantasy setting of Estoria.

Gameplay
Lost Words is split into two separate gameplay modes, one of which takes place in the fantasy world of Estoria and the other in Izzy’s journal. Within the journal, words are used as platforms, which can be used to navigate through Izzy's diary. Asterisks allow the player to read additional text and both words and sketches are used to move to further pages. Words are used by the player to interact with the world by casting spells and solving puzzles. Each level also has 20 fireflies, which can be collected throughout the game. Collecting all fireflies will unlock the game's true ending.

Development
Lost Words initially explored the effect Izzy's parents' divorce had on her life. The team later decided to explore themes that were more applicable to a wide audience. The levels of the game are based on the five stages of grief but are presented in a hopeful and optimistic fashion. The story of Lost Words is written by Rhianna Pratchett.

Sketchbook Games also worked with The Wellcome Trust to speak to child psychologists about children going through trauma, and how they develop coping mechanisms for them. The team wanted to create a sense of hope and joy to be found in Izzy's tale and wanted it to have a positive impact on the player.

Modus Games officially unveiled the game in June 2019 at E3.

Reception 

Lost Words: Beyond the Page received mixed reviews for the Windows and PlayStation 4 versions, while the Nintendo Switch, Xbox One, Stadia versions received positive reviews, according to the review aggregator website Metacritic. 

Vikki Blake of Eurogamer rated the game 3/5, calling it a "a simple, flawed yet beautiful adventure". She praised the games bright and colourful backdrops and the musical scores, which accompanies the player on their journey, by calling them "splendorous". She also praised Pratchett's writing on the game citing it "is rich with the universal truths we all know and have experienced first-hand". However, she panned the games "lack of challenge and sophistication" and preferred the journal segments over "galloping" through Estoria. She ended her review by stating Lost Words might not be for everyone, granted, but it's a potent, powerful experience nonetheless.

Kimberley Wallace of Game Informer gave Lost Words a 7.75/10, saying the game is an interesting way to tell an interactive story, venturing into territory that isn't often explored in video games. Wallace disliked the awkward controls and stated technical hiccups "bring down the experience". Despite what she disliked about Lost Words, Wallace went on to state "I'm glad it exists, despite its flaws".

References 

2020 video games
Fantasy video games
Nintendo Switch games
Stadia games
PlayStation 4 games
Puzzle-platform games
Video games developed in the United Kingdom
Video games featuring female protagonists
Windows games
Xbox One games
Single-player video games